Ramses Shaffy (29 August 1933 – 1 December 2009) was a Dutch-French singer and actor who became popular during the 1960s. His most famous songs include "Zing, vecht, huil, bid, lach, werk en bewonder", "We zullen doorgaan", "Pastorale", "Sammy" and "Laat me". He frequently collaborated with Dutch singer Liesbeth List.

Biography 
Shaffy was born on 29 August 1933 in Paris, in the suburb Neuilly-sur-Seine. His father was an Egyptian diplomat Ramsès Shaffy Bey, and his mother was a Polish-Russian countess Alexandra de Wysocka. He grew up with his mother in Cannes. When she was infected with tuberculosis, Shaffy was sent to an aunt in Utrecht. Eventually, he ended up in a foster family in Leiden.

He did not finish high school, but he was accepted at the Amsterdam school of theatre arts in 1952. In 1955, he made his debut with the Nederlandse Comedie. He went to Rome in 1960 aspiring to be a film actor, but was unsuccessful in the endeavour. In the 1960s, Shaffy had a relationship with Dutch actor  (1937–2006). In 1964 he founded Shaffy Chantant, a theatre group, which led to his first collaborations with chanteuse Liesbeth List. He worked with Dutch pianist Louis van Dijk. Among others, musician Thijs van Leer was a member of the group for a short period of time. With Liesbeth List, Shaffy recorded the classic song "Pastorale" (Sun and Moon). His hit song "We zullen doorgaan" was parodied by comedian André van Duin in 1975.

He temporarily stopped his habit of heavy drinking when he became a member of the Rajneesh movement in the 1980s.

In the 1980s, Shaffy returned to the stage and the set as an actor. He played Don Quixote in the musical De man van La Mancha in 1993. He also played the role of Count of Egmont in the Flemish/Dutch miniseries Willem van Oranje.   made a documentary about Shaffy in 2002, titled Ramses. It won a Golden Calf, the award of the Netherlands Film Festival. The film shows Shaffy's life in a rest home in Amsterdam. He had to move to a rest home, suffering from Korsakoff-like symptoms, caused by heavy alcohol use.

Shaffy's condition slightly improved in the years following the film. His memory improved and he sometimes made public appearances again. In the fall of 2005, he re-recorded his 1978 hit song "Laat me", together with List and the band , which became a minor hit.

Death 
On 5 May 2009 it was made public that Shaffy suffered from esophageal cancer. He died of the disease in the Dr. Sarphati House, Amsterdam, where he had lived the last seven years, on 1 December 2009, aged 76. The public took leave of him at the Royal Carré Theatre in Amsterdam.

Portrayal 
In 2014, a four-part drama series about the young Ramses Shaffy titled Ramses was produced by the AVRO for Dutch television. Actor Maarten Heijmans portrayed Shaffy.

Accolades 
 In 2002, Ramses Shaffy received a Knighthood of the Order of the Dutch Lion.
 On 23 June 2017, the Ramses Shaffy Home (residential space for artists) was opened in Amsterdam.

Discography 

 Shaffy Chantant (1966)
 Ramses II (1966)
 Shaffy Chantate (1967)
 Sunset Sunkiss (1970)
 Zonder bagage (1971)
 We zullen doorgaan (1972)
 We leven nog (1975)
 Samen (1976, with Liesbeth List)
 Ramses en Liesbeth live (1977, with Liesbeth List)
 Dag en nacht (1978)
 Live (1980)
 Sterven van geluk (1988)

References

External links 

 Official site
 

1933 births
2009 deaths
20th-century Dutch male actors
Male actors from Amsterdam
Bisexual male actors
Bisexual singers
Deaths from cancer in the Netherlands
Deaths from esophageal cancer
Dutch male film actors
20th-century Dutch male singers
Dutch people of Egyptian descent
Dutch people of Russian descent
Dutch people of Polish descent
Dutch pianists
Dutch male stage actors
Dutch male television actors
Dutch LGBT singers
French LGBT singers
20th-century pianists
Rajneesh movement
Male pianists
20th-century French male singers
20th-century LGBT people